Expolanka Holdings PLC is a diversified conglomerate with interests in logistics, leisure and ventures with a global presence in 20 countries and over 50 cities.

History
Expolanka Limited was established in 1978 as the Sri Lankan economy was liberalised and is the flagship company of Expolanka Holdings. Initially a pioneer exporter of fresh produce, Expolanka has had sustained growth emerging as a strong group of companies. The group has diversified into exports, imports and trading, freight forwarding & logistics, manufacturing, airline representation & operation, travels & tours and information technology over the years.

New Developments
Having announced on 26 April 2011, its intention to go public with an initial public offering after successful private placement of its shares to broadbase ownership, Expolanka Holdings went ahead with the IPO on 12 May 2011 floating 172,000,000 ordinary voting shares at LKR 14 per share.

Listed on the main board of the Colombo Stock Exchange, Expolanka Holdings PLC ranks among the top 5 diversified conglomerates in the bourse with a market cap of Rs. 27 billion as of 26 July 2011

In May 2014, SG Holdings, Japan's second largest logistics firm, acquired a 30% stake in Expolanka Holdings PLC triggering mandatory offer requirements set by Sri Lanka's Securities and Exchange Commission. In June 2014, SG Holdings confirmed that it has secured controlling interest in Expolanka with the acquisition of over 51% of total shares.

References

External links
 Official website
 Daily Mirror news on Expolanka
 ‘Expolanka Teas’ raises Rs. 6 m at Charity Tea Auction for cancer patients
 News Article on Expolanka
 IPO

Companies listed on the Colombo Stock Exchange
Conglomerate companies of Sri Lanka